Richard Fetherston (Fetherstone, Featherstone) (died 30 July 1540) was an English Roman Catholic priest. He was Archdeacon of Brecon and Chaplain to Catharine of Aragon and tutor to her daughter, Mary Tudor. He was executed in 1540 and beatified by Pope Leo XIII on 29 December 1886.

Life
He is called sacrae theologiae Doctor by John Pits (De illustribus Angliae scriptoribus, 729). He was one of the theologians appointed to defend Queen Catharine's cause in the divorce proceedings before the papal legates Cardinal Wolsey and Cardinal Campeggio, and is said to have written a treatise Contra divortium Henrici et Catharinae, Liber unus. No copy of this work is known to exist.

He took part in the session of Convocation which began in April 1529, and was one of the few members who refused to sign the Act declaring Henry VIII's marriage with Catharine to be illegal ab initio, through the pope's inability to grant a dispensation in such a case. In 1534 he was called upon to take the Oath of Supremacy and, on refusing to do so, was committed to the Tower of London on 13 December 1534. He seems to have remained in prison until 1540.

He was hanged, drawn, and quartered at Smithfield on 30 July 1540, together with the Catholic theologians Thomas Abel and Edward Powell, like himself councillors to Queen Catharine in the divorce proceedings, and three others, Robert Barnes, Thomas Garret, and William Jerome, condemned for teaching Zwinglianism. All six were drawn through the streets upon three hurdles, a Catholic and a heretic on each hurdle. The Protestants were burned, and the three Catholics executed in the usual manner, their limbs being fixed over the gates of the city and their heads being placed upon poles on London Bridge.

Notes

References

Attribution
 The entry cites: 
John Pits, De illustribus Angliae scriptoribus (Paris, 1619), 729; 
Sander, tr. Lewis, Rise and Growth of the Anglican Schism (London, 1877), 65, 67, 150; 
Gilbert Burnet, History of the Reformation, ed. Pocock (Oxford, 1865), I, 260, 472, 566–67; IV, 555, 563; 
Thomas Tanner, Bibliotheca Britannico-Hibernica (London, 1748), 278; 
Original Letters Relative to the English Reformation (Parker Society, Cambridge, 1846), I, 209; 
Calendar of State Papers, Henry VIII, ed. Gairdner (London, 1882, 1883, 1885, VI, 311, 1199; VII, 530; VIII, 666, 1001.

1540 deaths
16th-century English Roman Catholic priests
English beatified people
People executed by Tudor England by hanging, drawing and quartering
16th-century venerated Christians
Year of birth unknown
English chaplains
Catholic chaplains
16th-century English educators
Executed English people
People executed under Henry VIII
Archdeacons of Brecon
Forty-one Martyrs of England and Wales